The International Business School (IBS) is a private, for-profit institution of post-secondary education  based in Nuremberg, Germany. It does not have German state accreditation. The school was founded in 1984 and focuses on business and management education. In April 2018, IBS announced that it would cease operation in 2021 and would accept no further students after the 2018 summer term.

History
The school was originally established in Lippstadt in 1984 as a GmbH (private limited company). By 2002 further branches were established in Bad Nauheim and Berlin. Nevertheless, on their websites the three IBS branches misrepresented themselves to prospective students as "non-profit" institutions.

Initially, the school offered only its own diploma in Internationale Betriebswirt (International Business Administration). However, unlike the  whose name it resembled, the IBS diploma was not recognized by the German state. In 2000, IBS began a partnership with the University of Lincoln whereby the British university would deliver and award a BA in Management and an MBA to IBS students via distance learning. The BA would require only two more years of study following acquisition of the IBS diploma. In their advertising, IBS claimed that students would receive a "double degree" (from both Lincoln University and IBS) that was "nationally and internationally recognized". In fact, this was not the case. Neither degree was recognized in Germany. For a foreign university BA to be recognized in Germany at that time, students were required to have attended that university for three full years. This led to numerous legal complaints from students.

In early 2005, a student at the Bad Nauheim branch sued IBS for "malicious deception" concerning the status of the degrees it offered. The judgement of the Frankfurt Oberlandesgericht (Higher Regional Court) awarded the student a full refund of tuition fees, further compensatory damages, and legal costs. By 2005 the partnership with University of Lincoln had ended, and similar partnerships were struck with the University of Surrey to deliver an MBA and the University of Sunderland to deliver a BA in management. By that time IBS was describing itself as an "American-style management academy" and a "private alternative to the university". The degrees on offer were no longer described as "nationally and internationally recognized".

A fourth IBS branch was established in Nuremberg in 2006. The other three branches (Lippstadt, Bad Nauheim, and Berlin) ultimately closed. In April 2018, the Director of IBS Nuremberg, Thomas Nau, announced that the school would cease operation in 2021 and would accept no further students after the 2018 summer term. He cited the steady decline in student enrollment as the principal reason for the impending closure. At the time of the announcement, the school had a total enrollment of 90 students. It was unclear how many of those were enrolled in the University of Sunderland degree programs. The University of Surrey partnership had ended by that time.

Programmes
As of 2018, the school has several bachelor's programs in business and management. These are all delivered and awarded by the University of Sunderland in the UK. IBS is not certified in Germany to award its own degrees. The school also has its own diploma programs in International Business Studies which do not have state certification. No further students were accepted after the 2018 summer term following IBS's announcement that it would close in 2021.

References

External links
 

Business schools in Germany
Universities and colleges in Bavaria
1984 establishments in Germany
Educational institutions established in 1984
Education in Nuremberg